Kwangwoon University (Abbreviated to Kwangwoon, KW and KWU) is a comprehensive, coeducational and private research university in Seoul (Wolgye Dong, Nowon-gu), South Korea, offering undergraduate and graduate programs (Master and Doctor). Chosun Radio Training Center, the predecessor of Kwangwoon University, was the first institution to teach electronic engineering studies in Korea(Chosun). The foundation is Kwangwoon Academy, an incorporated educational institution. As of 2019， there are 11,500 undergraduates and 1,292 graduate students. The nearest subway station is Kwangwoon University Station, Seoul Metro Line 1.

Kwangwoon University has been recognized for its academic reputation in engineering and IT fields.
Kwangwoon University was ranked 56th in Asia in field of Engineering in the 2014 and 2015 by Quacquarelli Symonds (QS)
and ranked 16th in Korea in field of Science and Engineering in 2015 by Korea Economic Daily (한국경제신문)

History

1934-1987
Kwangwoon started as Chosun Radio Training Center established to promote the advancement of radio technical knowledge. It was renamed in 1940 as the Chosun Institute of Radio Engineering. Started as Dong-guk Electronics College in 1962, the school became Kwangwoon Institute of Technology in 1964 and a four-year granting Kwangwoon University in 1987.

The school became a comprehensive university in 1987. Until 1995, the university was ranked top 10 overall and top 3 in the engineering fields in South Korea.

Today there are eight colleges in Kwangwoon University: College of Electronics & Information Engineering, College of Engineering, College of Natural Sciences, Division of Korean Language and Literature, College of Social Sciences, College of Law, College of Business, and College of Northeast Asia. Located in Wolgye-dong, Nowon-gu, Seoul, Kwangwoon University carries out international exchanges and cooperation programs with 83 universities worldwide in the areas of education and research.

Global Capability Reinforcement System
Kwangwoon University introduced the English certification system, and gives lectures in English in 33% of the classes of major subjects as of 2011. Since 2011, freshmen have to achieve a degree of proficiency in a second foreign language (Chinese, Japanese, Spanish, or Russian) before graduation. In addition, exchange agreements have been signed with universities worldwide.

 Operating student exchange programs with 127 universities and 2 education consortia in 25 nations including the US, Japan, and China,
 Signed an agreement with University of Arkansas in the US for unlimited student exchanges.
 Established a joint course with Qingdao Science & Technology University, China, to train in architecture.

Rankings and reputation
 Kwangwoon University ranked 56th out of Universities of Asia in field of Engineering in the 2014 and 2015 by Quacquarelli Symonds (QS),
Kwangwoon University ranked in the top 10 universities of Korea in 2013 and 2015 by Dong-A Ilbo,
Kwangwoon University ranked 16th out of the nation's universities in field of Science and Engineering in 2015 by Korea Economic Daily (한국경제신문)
Kwangwoon University ranked 28th out of the nation's universities in the 2011 by JoongAng Ilbo. Remarkly,
1.Research sector ranked 14th (2011)
2.Number of SCI papers per professors in science and technology field ranked 15th (2011)
3.Employment rate of graduates ranked 15th (2011)
4.Affiliated average of individual research funds per professor ranked 4th (2011)
5.Average of outside research fund per professor ranked 6th (2011)
6.Rate of English lectures ranked 10th (2011)
 Kwangwoon University has shown its power in research. The number of publications in international journals (SCI papers) and domestic papers per professors ranked 2nd among universities in Korea for three consecutive years (2010-2012).

Graduate schools
Graduate School
Graduate School of Business Administration
Graduate School of Smart Convergence
Graduate School of Education
Graduate School of Environment Studies
Graduate School of Counseling, Welfare and Policy
Graduate School of information and Communication

Schools and divisions

College of Electronics & Information Engineering
Chosun Radio Training Center, the predecessor of Kwangwoon University, was the first institution to teach electronic engineering studies in Korea(Chosun). Kwangwoon University established primally college of Electronics&Information Engineering and Department of Electronic engineering in Republic of Korea. To be exact, Dr. Cho Kwangwoon brought the study of electronic engineering to Korea(Chosun), and Chosun Radio Training Center that is the predecessor of Kwangwoon University established in 1934 is the first academy to teach the study of electronic engineering in Chosun(Korea).
As the largest college in the electronics and information engineering field, the College of Electronics and Information Engineering of Kwangwoon University provides field-oriented engineering education and it aims to produce practical, creative, globally competitive and technically specialized individuals who can lead the knowledge-based, 21st century.

Department of Electronic Engineering
Department of Electronics & Communications Engineering
Department of Electronic Convergence Engineering
Department of Electric Engineering
Department of Electronic Materials Engineering
Division of Robotics: (Information Control, Intelligence System)

College of Software and Convergence Technology
It is the largest college for software in Korea. With the best systems and capabilities, Kwangwoon University's College of Software and Convergence Technology is nurturing the most needed software convergence experts in the modern industry.

School of Software
School of Computer and Information Engineering
Department of Information Convergence

College of Engineering
Kwangwoon University's College of Engineering aims to produce specialized individuals who can effectively apply their basic theoretical knowledge and successfully compete in the global environment, through practical education that offers field-applicable knowledge and through intensive, practical studies that promote development of creativity

Department of Architectural Engineering
Department of Chemical Engineering
Department of Environmental Engineering
Department of Architecture

College of Natural Sciences
Under the goals of ‘producing independent and self-reliant individuals with new knowledge’ and ‘providing education that values practicality, creativity and field-relevant education’. Kwangwoon University's College of Natural Sciences aims to provide education and carry out research on academic knowledge and application our society demands and to produce well-rounded specialists who can contribute to the betterment of our society and humanity.

Department of Mathematics
Department of Electrical and Biological Physics
Department of Chemistry
Department of Sports & Leisure Studies
Department of Information Contents (evening program)

College of Business
Kwangwoon University's College of Business aims to produce professional managers that can lead this highly competitive, globalized and informatized 21st century of ours.

Division of Business Administration
Division of International Trade: (Korea-Japan Trade Major, Korea-China Trade Major)

College of Humanities and Social Sciences
Kwangwoon University's College of Humanities and Social Sciences aims to produce leaders who can apply their humanistic insights and knowledge to open up new future and society according to the changes we see in our information era and individuals who can creatively look into, study and analyze social phenomena.

Department of Korean Language and Literature
Department of English Language and Literature
School of Communications: (Media and Information, Digital Media, Strategic Communication)
Department of Industrial Psychology
Division of Northeast Asia Cultural Industries: (Cultural Exchange, Cultural Content Development)

College of Law and Public Policy
Kwangwoon University's College of Law and Public Policy produces global individuals who can lead Korea and the international community and well-rounded individuals equipped with a sound legal judgment, administrative capabilities and global competitiveness.

Department of Public Administration
Division of Law
Division of International Studies: (International Area Studies, Global Korea)
Department of Asset Management (evening program)

Ingenium College

College of Northeast Asia (Abolished)
In 2008, The college of northeast Asia was established. However, due to the education ministry's order, each department has been banned from accepting new students since 2016. Therefore, the three departments were relocated to the college of business, the college of humanities and social sciences and the college of law and public·policy, respectively.

Division of Northeast Asia Trade
Division of Northeast Asia Industry and Culture
Division of International Studies

International Cooperations
Kwangwoon University has signed Agreements with several international Universities.

Germany
 Hochschule Macromedia, University of Applied Sciences
 Fachhochschule des Mittelstandes
 University of Applied Sciences - Zwickau

Student activities and awards
{||-
|valign="top"|  
|valign="top"|

Student activities
Kwangwoon University Global Challengers
Kwangwoon University Global Volunteers in countries such as Indonesia, Vietnam, Lao, Mongolia and Nepal.
Kwangwoon University Robot Camp for youth since 2008

Awards
Academics

International Awards
ROBIT won 6 gold medals and ranked 2nd of 2008 RoboGames in United States of America
The team HOMERUN won the 1st prize in Imagine Cup 2011 for Window Phone held by Microsoft, United States of America
ROBIT won the championship of the 3rd Asia Robo-one in Korea, 2007.
ROBIT won championship in humanoid in International Robot contest in three years 2008, 2013 and 2014 held in Korea 
ROBIT won the championship of the 15th Robo-One in Japan, 2009
ROBIT won the presidential award for 2009 International Robot Contest, Busan, Korea 
Robot Team (BARAM) won the Chairman's Award in Texas Instruments Innovation Challenge: Korean MCU Design Contest 2013.
 Robot Team (ROBIT) won the presidential awards in 2015, 2016 and 2017 International Robot Contest and R-BIZ challenge among 3000 participated teams,
 Kwangwoon University Robot team (Robit) ranked 2nd in 2017 international Robocup: RobocupSoccer humanoid Teen size held in Nagoya, Japan, 2017;

National Awards

Robot team won championship at the 1st Robo-1 University League, 2005
ROBOT Team (ROBIT)won the championship of the Super Robot Grand Prix (SRGP) sponsored KT Corporation (Korea Telecom), 2007
 Kwangwoon University team won the champion of the Korean Shakespeare Festival for two consecutive years 2012 and 2013
Robot Team (BARAM) won the grand prize in 2013 Korea Intelligent Robot Contest, Korea
 The Students from Department of Computer Engineering won the 1st prize in the first Hyundai Hackathon: Connect the Unconnected in 2016 held by Hyundai Motor Group
 Kwangwoon University Robot team (Robit) won championship of 2017 Robocup Korea Open: soccer humanoid League for Students from Korea and other countries 
 SPORTS
 Kwangwoon University soccer team won the championship of the 2007 Fall Season of KBSN University Soccer Match
 Kwangwoon University soccer team won the second prize of the 2009 Fall Season of the National University Soccer Games
 Kwangwoon University soccer team won the champion of the 2014 Cafe Bene U-League championship for University Soccer teams
 Kwangwoon University ice hockey team won the champion of the 98th National Winter Sport Contest for Korean Universities

Alumni and faculty

Notes

See also
Kwangwoon Electronics Technical High School

References

External links
 Kwangwoon University website 
 Kwangwoon University website 

 
Universities and colleges in Seoul
1934 establishments in Korea
Educational institutions established in 1934
Nowon District